The 1919 Bremen state election was held on 9 March 1919 to elect the 200 members of the Bremen National Assembly.

Results

References 

Bremen
1919
March 1919 events in Europe
March 1919 events